Viviane Aleyda Morales Hoyos (born 17 March 1962) was the 7th Attorney General of Colombia and the first woman to hold that post. She was elected by the Supreme Court of Justice out of a list of three candidates presented by President Juan Manuel Santos Calderón that also included Juan Carlos Esguerra Portocarrero and Carlos Gustavo Arrieta Padilla. On 2 March 2012, she resigned days after her election as Attorney General was invalidated by the Council of State due to irregularities in her election. Her resignation was accepted on 5 March 2012 by the Supreme Court.

She was part of the Colombian Senate from 2014 until 2018.

She is well known in Colombia as being one of the opposing figures of the same sex marriage, and in particular the adoption of kids by same sex couples, owing to her Christian faith. Morales is a popular figure among Pentecostals and other Protestant Christians in Colombia, as they make up 70-80% of her voter base.

Viviane was a presidential candidate for the 2018-2022 period, but she resigned. Her vice presidential formula was Jorge Leyva Durán.

She is currently the ambassador of Colombia to France.

References

1962 births
Living people
People from Bogotá
Del Rosario University alumni
University of Paris alumni
Colombian women in politics
Colombian Liberal Party politicians
Members of the Senate of Colombia
Colombian women lawyers
Attorneys General of Colombia
Colombian evangelicals
Colombian anti-same-sex-marriage activists